Ferocactus hamatacanthus, commonly named Turk's Head, is a barrel cactus in the tribe Cacteae.

Distribution

Ferocactus hamatacanthus is widespread in the Chihuahuan Desert of north-western Mexico, New Mexico, and south-western Texas. The Ferocactus hamatacanthus Type Locality was found in Mexico.

Description
This plant contains 13 ribs normally, but can sometimes be around 17. One of the central spines is hooked at its apex as well.

In addition to these features, its seeds are pitted.

Features
At first, these glands are soft, but as they mature they become hard and spine-like. Another key feature is the difference of its fruit compared to other species. The fruit of this species is thin and the flesh is very juicy and edible, reminiscent of kiwis in flavor.

References

hamatacanthus
Cacti of Mexico
Cacti of the United States
Flora of the Chihuahuan Desert
Flora of Northeastern Mexico
Flora of New Mexico
Flora of Texas